"I'll Leave This World Loving You" is a country music song written by Wayne Kemp and Mack Vickery. Kemp released it in 1980 on the Mercury Records label. He had previously recorded the song in 1974 for MCA Records, and used this version as the B-side to his 1974 single "Harlan County".

The song was later covered by Ricky Van Shelton in 1988. It was released in August 1988 as the lead-off single from his album Loving Proof.  It was the fourth consecutive Number One single of Shelton's career, as well as his first multi-week Number One.

Chart positions

Wayne Kemp

Ricky Van Shelton

Year-end charts

References

1980 singles
1988 singles
Ricky Van Shelton songs
Songs written by Wayne Kemp
Songs written by Mack Vickery
Song recordings produced by Steve Buckingham (record producer)
Columbia Nashville Records singles
1974 songs